Isogenoides is a genus of springflies in the family Perlodidae. There are about eight described species in Isogenoides.

Species
These eight species belong to the genus Isogenoides:
 Isogenoides colubrinus (Hagen, 1874)
 Isogenoides doratus (Frison, 1942)
 Isogenoides elongatus (Hagen, 1874)
 Isogenoides frontalis (Newman, 1838) (hudsonian springfly)
 Isogenoides hansoni (Ricker, 1952) (Appalachian springfly)
 Isogenoides olivaceus (Walker, 1852)
 Isogenoides varians (Walsh, 1862)
 Isogenoides zionensis Hanson, 1949

References

Further reading

 
 

Perlodidae
Articles created by Qbugbot